Two Japanese warships have borne the name Kamome:

 , a  launched in 1904 and stricken in 1923
 , a  launched in 1929 and sunk in 1944

Imperial Japanese Navy ship names
Japanese Navy ship names